Andrew Bobbin (born 8 November 1978) is a former professional rugby league footballer who played for the St. George Illawarra Dragons. An Illawarra junior,  his lone first grade appearance was in his side's 25–12 loss to the Sydney Roosters at the Sydney Football Stadium in round 25 of the 2001 NRL season. In the same year, he played for St. George Illawarra in their 2001 reserve grade grand final winning team. After retirement, Bobbin became a horse trainer.

References

External links
RLP Profile

1978 births
Living people
Australian rugby league players
Rugby league players from Bega, New South Wales
St. George Illawarra Dragons players